Robin Henry Charles Neville, 10th Baron Braybrooke  (29 January 1932 – 5 June 2017) was a British peer and military officer. He served as Lord Lieutenant of Essex from 1992 until 2000.

Biography 
Robin Henry Charles Neville was born on 29 January 1932 as the only son of Henry Seymour Neville, 9th Baron Braybrooke and Muriel Evelyn Manning. When he was seven years old, during World War II, he was evacuated to Llandovery, Carmarthenshire in South West Wales and stayed at the home of a retired guard of the Great Western Railway. While staying in Llandovery he developed an interest in railways. He later had a miniature railway built at Audley End.

He was educated at Eton College and served in the Rifle Brigade. From 1951 to 1952 he served in the 3rd Battalion King's African Rifles in Kenya and Malaya. When he returned to England after his military service, he studied history at Magdalene College, Cambridge, graduating in 1955. He held honorary degrees from the University of Essex and Anglia Ruskin University.

Braybrooke had only a life interest in the Audley End Estate due to a will trust created by the 7th Baron. The current beneficiaries of Audley End Estate are (but not limited to) the heirs general of the only daughter of the 7th Baron.

A trained pilot, he operated a small airfield on the Audley End Estate called the Audley End International Aerodome. Audley End House was sold to English Heritage in 1948 by the trustees of the estate in tenure of the 9th Baron Braybrooke. Lord Braybrooke became Deputy Lieutenant of Essex from 1980 to 1992.

Lord Braybrooke was married three times. In 1955 he married his first wife, Robin, with whom he had five daughters: Amanda Muriel May Neville, Caroline Emma Neville, Henrietta Jane Neville, Victoria Neville, and Arabella Neville. One of his daughters from his first marriage, Henrietta, died in a riding accident. He had three daughters with his second wife, Linda: Sara Lucy Neville, Emma Charlotte Neville, and Lucinda Octavia Neville. He married his third wife, Perina (née Courtauld), in 1998.

He succeeded his father and became the 10th Baron Braybrooke in 1990. From 1992 to 2000 he served as Lord Lieutenant of Essex.

He died on 5 June 2017 at Abbey House near Saffron Walden. A private funeral was held at the Church of St Mary the Virgin on 21 July 2017. He was succeeded to the Barony by his third cousin, Richard Neville. On his death the life interest in the 6,500 acre Audley End Estate transferred to Louise Newman, the granddaughter of the 7th Baron Braybrooke. His eldest daughter, Amanda, criticised primogeniture, which stops daughters from inheriting titles where the original letters patent specify that it may be inherited by males only.

References 

1932 births
2017 deaths
Barons Braybrooke
Lord-Lieutenants of Essex
Alumni of Magdalene College, Cambridge
People educated at Eton College
Rifle Brigade soldiers
King's African Rifles officers
Robin
Braybrooke